Margarita Mariscal de Gante (born 10 January 1954) is a Spanish judge and politician, who served as the minister of justice from 1996 to 2000.

Early life
Gante was born in Madrid on 10 January 1954. She is the daughter of Jaime Mariscal de Ghent, a judge of the Public Order Tribunal created in Francoist Spain. The brother of this judge, Commissioner Mariscal de Gante, is also known for having invited the torturer Billy el Niño, the alias of Antonio González Pacheco, to celebrate in a police station in Madrid. She has a law degree.

Career
Gante worked as a judge in different cities of Spain before she attained her ministerial appointment. She is a member of the Popular party. She was appointed minister of justice on 6 May 1996, replacing  Juan Alberto Belloch in the post. She was in office until 28 April 2000 and Ángel Acebes replaced her as justice minister. She was elected to the congress of deputies in 2000, representing Albacete Province, and served there until 2004. During her term she was the first vice-president of the congress.

References

External links

20th-century women judges
20th-century Spanish women politicians
21st-century Spanish women politicians
1954 births
Female justice ministers
Justice ministers of Spain
Living people
Members of the 7th Congress of Deputies (Spain)
Members of the General Council of the Judiciary
People's Party (Spain) politicians
Politicians from Madrid
Spanish women judges
Women government ministers of Spain